Edward Synge, D.D., M.A., B.A. (1659–1741) was an Anglican clergyman who served in the Church of Ireland as Chancellor of St Patrick's Cathedral, Dublin (1705–1714), Bishop of Raphoe (1714–1716), and Archbishop of Tuam (1716–1741).

Part of a long line of clergy, Synge is also an ancestor of famous playwright John Millington Synge and the composer Mary Helena Synge.

Biography 
Born on 6 April 1659 at Inishannon in County Cork, he was the second son of Edward Synge, Bishop of Cork, Cloyne and Ross. He was educated at Christ Church, Oxford and Trinity College, Dublin. 

In the late 1600s he was made the rector  of Holy Trinity Church, Rathclaren. He was nominated the bishop of Raphoe on 7 October and consecrated on 7 November 1714. He was translated to archbishopric of Tuam by letters patent on 8 June 1716. Synge built a new bishop's palace in Tuam in the late 1710s.

A renowned preacher, his works were frequently published and included an exhortation to frequent communion translated into Welsh. Amongst other achievements he established a dynasty of prominent ecclesiastics and literary figures closely integrated into the Protestant squirearchy in the west of Ireland.

He died in office on 23 July 1741, aged 82.

Family 
His father, also named Edward, was the Bishop of Cork, Cloyne, and Ross. He had two sons were Edward and Nicholas, both of whom became bishops in their own right. Edward Synge is a direct ancestor of  playwright John Millington Synge.

References

Bibliography

 
 

1659 births
1741 deaths
Anglican bishops of Raphoe
Anglican archbishops of Tuam
Members of the Irish House of Lords
Irish Anglican archbishops